The 2011 Ladies European Tour was a series of golf tournaments for elite female golfers from around the world which took place from February through December 2011. The tournaments were sanctioned by the Ladies European Tour (LET).

The tour featured 24 official money events, as well as the Tenerife Ladies Match Play, the European Nations Cup and the Solheim Cup. Ai Miyazato won the Order of Merit with earnings of €363,080, despite only playing in two events. Caroline Hedwall won Rookie of the Year and Player of the Year honours, after finishing third in the Order of Merit and winning four events.

Schedule
The table below shows the 2011 schedule. The numbers in brackets after the winners' names show the number of career wins they had on the Ladies European Tour up to and including that event. This is only shown for members of the tour.

Key

Order of Merit rankings

External links
 Official site of the Ladies European Tour
 Ladies European Tour Information Centre

Ladies European Tour
Ladies European Tour
Ladies European Tour